Dimitrios Stefanakos (19 October 1936 – 17 December 2021) was a Greek footballer who played for Olympiacos and the Greece national team.

Career
Born in Kalamata, Stefanakos fled the German occupation with his family before beginning his football career as a defender with Iperochi Neapoleos in 1946, until he joined Alpha Ethniki side Olympiacos F.C. in July 1965. He spent most of his senior career with Olympiacos winning the league championship six times and the cup eight times. Stefanakos left Olympiacos in 1965 for Rangers in South Africa, and finished his career with Corinthians in Brazil.

Stefanakos made eight appearances for the Greece national team from 1958 to 1963.

Filmography
Stefanakos appeared in seven Greek movies.

Personal life and death
Stefanakos was married to Martha Karagianni. The couple had a child who died three days after the birth. The couple separated few months later. He died on 17 December 2021, at the age of 85.

References

1936 births
2021 deaths
Greek actors
Footballers from Kalamata
Greek footballers
Association football defenders
Greece international footballers
Olympiacos F.C. players
Rangers F.C. (South Africa) players
Sport Club Corinthians Paulista players
Greek expatriate footballers
Expatriate soccer players in South Africa